The 2011 South Gloucestershire Council election took place on 5 May 2011 to elect members of South Gloucestershire unitary authority in England.

Election result

Ward results

In wards that are represented by more than one councillor, electors were given more than one vote each, hence the voter turnout may not match the number of votes cast.

References

2011 English local elections
2011
2010s in the South Gloucestershire District